Cities XL 2011 is a city simulator developed by Focus Home Interactive. Cities XL 2011 is the second game in the Cities XL franchise. The game focuses on a single-player mode, and was released on October 14, 2010. New features include more buildings and maps, improved public transport, an enhanced tax system, and better trading options.

Development

The game was officially announced by Focus Home Interactive, who took over the game license when Monte Cristo shut down due to the poor sales of Cities XL.

Release 

Cities XL 2011 was released on October 14, 2010.

Reception 

Cities XL 2011 received average reviews. IGN describes the game as "much like its predecessor, minus the multiplayer" and concludes that it "doesn't have much new to offer". The review did however praise the game's tutorial and graphics. GameZone compared Cities XL 2011 to Civilization IV and concluded that "while the lack of a game-winning goal or story won't sit well with some players, it by no means disrupts the addictive nature of Cities XL 2011". Aggregate review websites give scores of 75.13% on GameRankings, and 70 (out of 100) on Metacritic.

References

External links 
 

2010 video games
City-building games
Video games developed in France
Windows games
Windows-only games
Focus Entertainment games